Moon Hyung-In is a professor at Dong-A University in Busan, South Korea.  He is a member of the Department of Medicinal Biotechnology, and he earned his PhD in the Department of Pharmacy at Sungkyunkwan University in 2001.

Moon was discovered in 2012 to have published a number of articles in academic journals by writing the peer review reports for them himself.  He submitted manuscripts to journals that allowed authors to suggest their own reviewers: he used false names and email addresses that he controlled, and he then submitted his own (glowing) reviews.  The articles were subsequently retracted when the nature of his submissions was discovered; he reportedly acknowledged falsifying data in his papers.

List of retracted articles
 Pharmaceutical Biology
 Pharmaceutical Biology 2011 49:2, 190–193

 Journal of Enzyme Inhibition and Medicinal Chemistry
 Journal of Enzyme Inhibition and Medicinal Chemistry [epub ahead of print], 2012, doi: 10.3109/14756366.2011.641014
 Journal of Enzyme Inhibition and Medicinal Chemistry [epub ahead of print], 2012, doi: 10.3109/14756366.2011.615746
 Journal of Enzyme Inhibition and Medicinal Chemistry 2010 25:5, 608-614
 Journal of Enzyme Inhibition and Medicinal Chemistry 2010 25:3, 391-393

 International Journal of Food Sciences and Nutrition
 Retracted Paper: International Journal of Food Sciences and Nutrition 2012; 63(5): 537–547, doi: 10.3109/09637486.2011.607801
 Retracted Paper: International Journal of Food Sciences and Nutrition 2011; 62(2): 102–105, doi: 10.3109/09637486.2010.513682
 Retracted Paper: International Journal of Food Sciences and Nutrition 2011; 62(3): 215–218, doi: 10.3109/09637486.2010.503187

 The Journal of Ethnopharmacology
 Retracted Paper: Journal of Ethnopharmacology 2005; 97(3): 21: Pages 567–571, doi: 10.1016/j.jep.2005.01.006

 FEBS Letters
 Retracted Paper: FEBS Letters 2006; 580(3): 769–774, doi: 10.1016/j.febslet.2005.12.094

 Phytotherapy Research
 Phytotherapy Research 2006; 20(8): 714-716, doi 10.1002/ptr.1941 
 Phytotherapy Research 2005; 19(3): 239–242, doi 10.1002/ptr.1682

Additional list of 20 more retracted papers
The list of these papers has been reported on Retraction Watch.

See also 
 List of scientific misconduct incidents

References

External links
University faculty webpage

Academic staff of Dong-a University
Living people
Year of birth missing (living people)